Nassim Innocenti (born 19 February 2002) is a French professional footballer who plays as a centre-back for Valenciennes in the French Ligue 2.

Professional career
Innocenti is a product of the youth academies of Entente Crest-Aouste, Lyon and Lille. On 29 June 2020, he signed his first professional contract with Lille, tying him until June 2023. Unable to get first team reps at Lille, he transferred to Valenciennes on 16 July 2022. He made his professional debut and Ligue 2 debut with Valenciennes as an early substitute in a 1–0 win over Le Havre on 6 August 2022.

International
Innocenti is of Burkinabé descent. He was called up to the France U19s in March 2021.

References

External links
 
 FFF Profile
 
 

2002 births
Living people
Sportspeople from Drôme
French footballers
French sportspeople of Burkinabé descent
Association football defenders
Valenciennes FC players
Ligue 2 players
Championnat National 3 players